The 2011–12 Monterrey season was the 65th professional season of Mexico's top-flight football league. The season is split into two tournaments—the Torneo Apertura and the Torneo Clausura—each with identical formats and each contested by the same eighteen teams. Monterrey began their season on July 23, 2011 against Chiapas, Monterrey play their homes games on Saturdays at 5:00pm local time.

In addition to the Primera División, Monterrey will play in the 2011–12 edition of the CONCACAF Champions League, in which they are the defending champions. Monterrey earned a direct berth into Group Stage by winning the 2010 Apertura. They opened their Champions League campaign on August 17, 2011 against Herediano of Costa Rica.

Monterrey won the CONCACAF Champions League for the second year and qualified to the 2012 FIFA Club World Cup when they defeated Santos Laguna in the final.

Torneo Apertura

Squad

Regular season

Apertura 2011 results

Monterrey did not qualify to the Final Phase

Goalscorers

Results

Results summary

Results by round

Transfers

In

Out

Torneo Clausura

Squad

Regular season

Clausura 2012 results

Final phase

Monterrey advanced 4–3 on aggregate

 
Monterrey advanced 2–0 on aggregate

Santos Laguna won 3–2 on aggregate

Goalscorers

Regular season

Source:

Final phase

Results

Results summary

Results by round

CONCACAF Champions League

Group standings

Group stage

Quarter-finals 

Monterrey won 7–2 on aggregate.

Semifinals 

Monterrey won 4–1 on aggregate.

Final 

Monterrey won 3–2 on aggregate

Monterrey won second title in history

Goalscorers

FIFA Club World Cup 

Monterrey participated in the 2011 FIFA Club World Cup in Japan as the winner of the 2010–11 CONCACAF Champions League from 8 to 18 December 2011. Monterrey began their participation on December 11, 2011 against Kashiwa Reysol, team that defeated Auckland City in the preliminary round.

Squad

Quarter-finals

Match for fifth place

References

2011–12 Primera División de México season
Mexican football clubs 2011–12 season
2011-12
2012